Virbia sanguicollis is a moth in the family Erebidae first described by George Hampson in 1901. It is found in Costa Rica.

References

sanguicollis
Moths described in 1901